This is a timeline documenting the events of heavy metal in the year 1979.

Newly formed bands
 220 Volt
 A II Z
 Atomkraft
 Axe
 Boss
Chorny Kofe
 Cloven Hoof
 Crimson Glory
 Deep Machine
 Demon
 Dokken
Europe 
 Exodus
The Exploited
 Faith No More (as Sharp Young Men)
 Fallout
Fishbone
 Girl
 Grim Reaper
 Hanoi Rocks
 Headpins
 Hollow Ground
 Icon
 Jaguar
The Joe Perry Project
 Kat
 Killer
Killing Joke
Loverboy
 Nightmare
 Night Ranger
 Persian Risk
 Picture
 Pomaranča
Saint Vitus 
 Salem
 Satan
 Savatage
 Michael Schenker Group
 Shark Island
Sheriff
 Spinal Tap
 Sweet Savage
Tokyo Blade
 Trouble
 TSA
T.T. Quick
 V8
 Vicious Rumors
 Witchfinder General

Albums & EPs

January

February

March

April

May

June

July

August

September

October

November

Events
 Ozzy Osbourne is kicked out of  Black Sabbath due to his ongoing problems with drugs and alcohol. His place is taken by Ronnie James Dio

References

1970s in heavy metal music
Metal